OFK Beograd (English: Belgrade Youth Football Club) is a Serbian professional football club based in Belgrade, more precisely in Karaburma, an urban neighborhood of the municipality of Palilula. It is part of the OSD Beograd sport society.

All up, the club has won 5 national championships, in the following seasons: 1930–31, 1932–33, 1934–35, 1935–36, and 1938–39; the club won these titles under their old name of BSK (Beogradski Sport Klub). The club has been cup winners five times also, winning in the following seasons: 1934, 1953, 1955, 1961–62, and 1965–66.

The club has also recorded significant results in European competition, reaching the 1962–63 European Cup Winners' Cup semi-finals where they lost to Tottenham Hotspur. They reached the 1972–73 UEFA Cup quarter-finals where they lost to FC Twente.

History

The beginning
The club was founded in 1945 as Metalac but it is considered to be the successor of BSK one of the most prominent football clubs in Kingdom of Serbia and later Kingdom of Yugoslavia. It was also the most successful club between 1923 and 1941, with five national champion titles. BSK played its first game on 13 October 1911 against Šumadija from Kragujevac and won 8–1.

In 1945, after World War II, the club was established under the name Metalac by some former members of BSK. This club carried the name until 1950, when it was renamed to BSK, but in the 1957 the name was altered into OFK (Serbian Latin: Omladinski fudbalski klub) Belgrade.

The golden era
A two-decade-long "Golden Era" began when the club won the Yugoslav Cup in 1953. Three other Yugoslav Cup wins followed, in 1955 and the 1961–62 and 1965–66 seasons. The club was the Yugoslav First League runner-up twice, in 1954–55 and in 1965–66. In the meantime, the club had changed its name once again. In 1957, the club was named OFK Beograd, once again in an attempt to attract spectators to the stadium, especially younger ones who often opted for either Red Star or Partizan. In that time, the players played elegant football and therefore got the nickname of "Romantičari".

The 1960s and the first half of the 1970s were years of European glory. OFK Beograd had participated eight times in European competitions. Their biggest success came in the 1962–63 European Cup Winners' Cup season, playing in the semi-final against Tottenham Hotspur, eventual champions. In the following ten years, teams such as Napoli, Feyenoord, Panathinaikos, and Juventus also lost to OFK Beograd.

The silent fall
The Romantičari were not able to take advantage of their success on the domestic and European scene. After several successful seasons, a sudden fall occurred. During the 1980s, the club often changed leagues from the First Division to the Second.

Modern era
In the summer of 2003, they were back in European competition. They played in the UEFA Intertoto Cup. OFK defeated Estonian side Narva Trans at home by the score of 6–1, but UEFA cancelled the result because of a smoke bomb being thrown on the field during the game.  Consequently, only the second leg result would count. OFK Beograd won in Tallinn with a score of 5–3. They were eliminated in the second round by Czech club 1. FC Slovácko, with a score of 4–3.

The club was back on the European stage in 2004. They started playing in the second round of the Intertoto Cup and eliminated Dinaburg. In the third round, OFK went on to play against Tampere United. OFK Beograd defeated their Finnish opponents and went on to play in the semifinals. They were eliminated by Atlético Madrid losing the first leg 1–3 at home with Aleksandar Simić scoring for OFK and Fernando Torres, Diego Simeone and Ariel Ibagaza scoring for Atlético, losing the second leg 2–0 in Madrid meant OFK were eliminated 1–5 on aggregate. Even though OFK were eliminated it was seen as an honour and a return to the club's glory days to have a European powerhouse such as Atlético play at Omladinski stadion with world class talents such as Torres and Simeone.

In 2005, the club entered the UEFA Cup in the second round of qualifying losing to Lokomotiv Plovdiv on the away goals rule. In 2006, the club faced French side Auxerre in the UEFA Cup. In the first game, in Belgrade, OFK defeated their opponents by the score of 1–0 a goal from centre-back Miloš Bajalica in the 31st minute of play proving the difference, a great result considering Auxerre was then one of France's strongest clubs. In the second game OFK Beograd lost 5–1 with the result standing at 2–1 for Auxerre with ten minutes to play, a result which would see OFK Beograd eliminate Auxerre. However, the young OFK team capitulated in the last ten minutes of play conceding three goals and were eliminated 5–2 on aggregate. In the 2010 Europa League, OFK beat Torpedo Zhodino of Belarus 3–2 on aggregate and went on to play Galatasaray where they lost 7–3 on aggregate, coming back from two-nil down to draw 2–2 with late goals been scored by Miloš Krstić and Nenad Injac in Turkey against Galatasaray but ultimately losing the second leg 1–5 at home with Danilo Nikolić scoring the only goal for OFK.

OFK Beograd were relegated from the Serbian SuperLiga after finishing fifteenth in the 2015–16 season. The next season saw relegation from the 2016–17 Serbian First League after finishing bottom of the table. The club played in the Serbian League Belgrade in the 2017–18 season (their first season in the Serbian third tier), finishing in second place behind Žarkovo who were promoted to the Serbian second tier.

In November 2018 the "Klub prijatelja OFK Beograda" was formed (trans. "Club of Friends of OFK Beograd") with the goal of saving the club from becoming extinct and helping the club through its most difficult times. The KPO is made up of loyal fans who want to see OFK return to its former glories competing at the very top of the first tier of Serbian football.

In their second year in the Serbian third division, OFK finished in fifth position on 46 points, The club did manage to win the Belgrade Cup though but Graficar were promoted to the second division, meaning OFK would compete for a third successive year in the Serbian third tier.

In the 2019–20 season, OFK commenced their third successive season in the Serbian third tier with hiring former accomplished player Stevica Kuzmanovski as coach. On 25 September 2019, in the last 32 of the Serbian Cup, OFK faced their city rivals FK Rad and won 3–2 with two goals from Andreja Lazović and one goal from Stefan Janković. This was considered quite a success as OFK where at this time in the Serbian third division and FK Rad in the Serbian top division the SuperLiga. COVID-19 Pandemic resulted in the season coming to a halt for clubs in the third division Belgrade league, OFK finished the season in a disappointing 3rd place. The eventual champions were IMT who were promoted to the Serbian First League (Second Division of the Serbian football pyramid), another hammer blow for OFK as a 4th consecutive season in the Serbian 3rd tier would come in season 2020–21 for a club barely surviving financially.

Honours

Domestic

League
 Yugoslav First League
  Winners (5): 1930–31, 1932–33, 1934–35, 1935–36, 1938–39
 Runners-up (6): 1927, 1929, 1937–38, 1939–40, 1954–55, 1963–64

Cups
 Yugoslav Cup
 Winners (5): 1934, 1953, 1955, 1961–62, 1965–66
 Serbia and Montenegro Cup
 Runners-up: 2005–06

European
 UEFA Cup Winners' Cup
 Semi-finals: 1962–63
 UEFA Cup
 Quarter-finals: 1972–73
 Inter-Cities Fairs Cup
 Semi-finals: 1958–60

Unofficial
 Serbian Championship
 Winners: 1919–20, 1920–21
 Serbian League (top level between 1940 and 1944)
 Winners: 1939–40, 1940–41, 1942–43, 1943–44
 Runners-up: 1941–42
 People's Republic of Serbia League (Belgrade championship)
 Winners: 1945
 Kingdom of Yugoslavia Cup (Serb region only)
 Winners: 1941

European competitions

Before UEFA was founded (in 1954), OFK Beograd, under the name of Beogradski Sport Klub (BSK), participated in Mitropa Cup, the first really international European football competition. The club competed for five seasons without a big success, usually stopped by teams from Hungary, the major football power at the time. In UEFA competitions, OFK Beograd played 16 seasons, the biggest success being reaching the semifinals of the 1962–63 European Cup Winners' Cup.

UEFA competitions summary

Youth system

OFK Beograd's youth system has a reputation as one of the best in the history of Serbian football. In its 107 years of existence, it produced and promoted hundreds of players who played not just for the club, but for the national team as well. Among these players are the likes of Josip Skoblar, Spasoje Samardžić, Ilija Petković, Slobodan Santrač, Dragoslav Stepanović, Mitar Mrkela, Saša Ćurčić, Duško Tošić, Branislav Ivanović, Aleksandar Kolarov, and many others.

Since OFK Beograd's existence, attention was always turned to the younger categories of players. Recently, the club has built a new private training center, comprising eight playing fields along with training equipment with the newest technology.

A youth school was created with 150 players born between 1996 and 1999. There are also seven competitive teams for which more than 170 players are playing. The youth system compromises around 20 highly qualified coaches who are all specialized in certain areas of the game. Most of the coaches are former players who spent years at the club and who also went through the same youth system. Several physios are also present and are equipped with the newest technology for their work.

Rivals
OFK's biggest rivals are FK Rad from the Belgrade suburb of Banjica. It is known as the small Belgrade derby. In the mid-2000s in a game between the two clubs in the last game of the season OFK scored a last minute equalizer against Rad meaning Rad were relegated for the first time in almost twenty-five years. In the following season when OFK were playing in the Intertoto Cup Rad fans threw a number of flares from outside the stadium forcing UEFA to award the game 3–0 against OFK even though OFK won the game 6–1 against Estonian club Narva Trans.

Other rivals to a much lesser degree include Crvena Zvezda and FK Partizan.

After being relegated to Serbian League Belgrade OFK have a bitter rivalry with FK Zemun.

Supporters

OFK Beograd's fans are commonly known as Plava Unija (The Blue Union) since 1994. When Beogradski Sportski Klub (BSK) was founded in 1911, the club which dominated the fields of the Kingdom of Serbs, Croats and Slovenes developed a significant fan base. Throughout the several wars that took place since the founding of BSK, the club's turbulent history has produced adverse effects on the average attendance of today's matches in which OFK Beograd plays.

An organized group appeared for the first time in 1984 under the name of "Blue Thunders". The group lived under that name until 1990. When they were influenced by the rise of nationalism in Yugoslavia, they change their name to "Sokolovi" (The Falcons). The group officially collapsed in 1993 about a year after UN sanctions were put on FR Yugoslavia. The fans' love towards the club was certainly not forgotten and in 1994 a new group is founded – Blue Union Belgrade. The name remains the title of OFK Beograd's main group of ultras.

OFK Beograd's fans have been known to be resistant of past regimes. In the 1990s, Milicionar, a pro-regime police-backed team, entered the first division. When OFK Beograd first played against them, the OFK fans reacted with creation of a banner which bore the message "Goal Against the Regime." Among other things, members of Plava Unija also reinstated the old ex-Yugoslav firms habit of finding local home crews when their team was on away matches, no matter which Serbian town or city was in question.

Plava Unija fostered a friendship with Voždovac's fans, "Invalidi" while the club still played in Yugoslavia's second tier from 1996 to 1998. That friendship still remains to this day. OFK Beograd is also known to be supported by fans of Dynamo Moscow and Anorthosis Famagusta.

Team kits
The Official team kit is currently produced by Spanish sports apparel company Joma.

Players

Current squad

UEFA competitions 
 Qualified for Europe in 14 seasons (2 in European Cup Winners' Cup, 9 in Europa League/UEFA Cup/Inter-Cities Fairs Cup, 3 in Intertoto Cup)

Notable former players
To appear in this section a player must have played at least one international match for their national team at any time.

Yugoslavia
  Milorad Arsenijević
  August Bivec
  Radivoj Božić
  Vojin Božović
  Ljubiša Đorđević
  Milorad Dragićević
  Prvoslav Dragićević
  Ernest Dubac
  Franjo Glaser
  Svetislav Glišović
  Ivan Jazbinšek
  Bruno Knežević
  Andreja Kojić
  Gustav Lechner
  Petar Manola
  Blagoje Marjanović
  Milorad Mitrović
  Milorad Nikolić
  Branimir Porobić
  Predrag Radovanović
  Janko Rodin
  Nikola Simić
  Kuzman Sotirović
  Slavko Šurdonja
  Aleksandar Tirnanić
  Dragomir Tošić
  Svetislav Valjarević
  Đorđe Vujadinović
  Sava Antić
  Slobodan Batričević
  Petar Borota
  Srđan Čebinac
  Dragan Gugleta
  Stanoje Jocić
  Miodrag Jovanović
  Tomislav Kaloperović
  Srboljub Krivokuća
  Frane Matošić
  Miloš Milutinović
  Mitar Mrkela
  Srđan Mrkušić
  Ilija Petković
  Petar Radenković
  Spasoje Samardžić
  Slobodan Santrač
  Dragoslav Šekularac
  Vasilije Šijaković
  Josip Skoblar
  Dragoslav Stepanović
  Lazar Tasić
  Nikoslav Bjegović
  Saša Ćurčić
  Petar Divić
  Nenad Jestrović
  Đorđe Jokić
  Miloš Kolaković
  Aleksandar Kristić
  Nenad Lalatović
  Milan Obradović
  Dušan Petković
  Gordan Petrić
  Saša Petrović
  Mihajlo Pjanović
  Dejan Rađenović
  Saša Stevanović
  Boris Vasković
  Aleksandar Živković
Serbia
  Nikola Aksentijević
  Stefan Babović
  Nikola Beljić
  Jovan Damjanović
  Aleksandar Ignjovski
  Radiša Ilić
  Branislav Ivanović
  Aleksandar Jevtić
  Andrija Kaluđerović
  Aleksandar Kolarov
  Ognjen Koroman
  Nenad Krstičić
  Milan Lukač
  Milovan Milović
  Aleksandar Paločević
  Slobodan Rajković
  Milan Rodić
  Bojan Šaranov
  Stefan Šćepović
  Vojislav Stanković
  Ivan Stevanović
  Duško Tošić
  Aleksandar Trišović
  Veseljko Trivunović
  Saša Zdjelar
Australia
  Branko Buljevic
  Milan Ivanović
  Doug Utjesenovic
Austria
  Sándor Nemes
Azerbaijan
  Branimir Subašić
Bosnia and Herzegovina 
  Faruk Hujdurović
  Petar Jelić
  Đorđe Kamber
Bulgaria
  Blagoy Simeonov
Cameroon
  Aboubakar Oumarou
Cyprus
  Milenko Špoljarić
France
  Ivan Bek
Kazakhstan
  Nenad Erić
Latvia
  Oļegs Karavajevs
Lithuania
  Kęstutis Ruzgys
North Macedonia
  Aleksandar Bajevski
  Filip Despotovski
  Boban Grnčarov
  Hristijan Kirovski
  Bojan Markoski
  Darko Micevski
  Angelko Panov
  Ostoja Stjepanović
Malta
  Nenad Veselji
Montenegro
  Vladan Adžić
  Marko Baša
  Dragan Bogavac
  Vladimir Božović
  Miodrag Džudović
  Petar Grbić
  Igor Ivanović
  Marko Janković
  Mladen Kašćelan
  Ivan Kecojević
  Nemanja Nikolić
  Mitar Novaković
  Milorad Peković
  Milan Purović
  Ivan Vuković
Romania
  Svetozar Popović
  Rudolf Wetzer
Slovakia
  Ján Podhradský
Uganda
  Khalid Aucho
United States
  Ilija Mitić

For the list of current and former players with Wikipedia article, please see: :Category:OFK Beograd players.

Coaching history

  Toni Szabó (1923–24)
  Adolf Engel (1927–29)
  Sándor Nemes (1930)
  Adolf Engel (1930–31)
  Nikola Simić (1931–32)
  Sándor Nemes (1932–34)
  Nikola Simić (1934)
  Josef Uridil (1935)
  Sándor Nemes (1935–39)
  István Mészáros (1939–40)
  Svetozar Popović (1941)
  Boško Ralić (1946–47)
  Ljubiša Broćić (1947–50)
  Milovan Ćirić (1951–53)
  Blagoje Marjanović (1953–56)
  Vojin Božović (1956–58)
  Vojin Božović (1959–60)
  Đorđe Vujadinović (1960–61)
  Milovan Ćirić (1961–63)
  Mile Kos &  Sava Antić (1963–64)
  Milovan Ćirić (1964–65)
  Dunja Milić (1965–66)
  Dunja Milić &  Miloš Milutinović (1966–67)
  Žarko Mihajlović (1967–69)
  Gojko Zec (1969–70)
  Božidar Drenovac (1970–1971)
  Boris Marović (1971–1973)
  Milutin Šoškić (1973–1976)
  Nikola Beogradac (1976–1978)
  Velimir Đorđević (1984–1988)
  Ilija Petković (1988–1989)
  Milan Živadinović (1990–1991)
  Ilija Petković (1991–1993)
  Blagomir Krivokuća (1993–1995)

  Božidar Milenković (1996–1997)
  Miodrag Ješić (1998–1999)
  Zlatko Krmpotić (1999–2000)
  Radmilo Ivančević (2000)
  Zvonko Varga (2000–2001)
  Stevica Kuzmanovski (2003–2004)
  Dragoljub Bekvalac (5 Apr 2004 – 15 May 2004)
  Branko Babić (30 Jun 2004 – Sept 30, 2005)
  Slobodan Krčmarević (23 Oct 2005 – 24 Dec 2006)
  Ratko Dostanić (25 Dec 2006 – 31 Mar 2007)
  Branislav Vukašinović (2 Apr 2007 – 8 Mar 2008)
  Ljupko Petrović (11 Mar 2008 – 21 Apr 2008)
  Mihailo Ivanović (21 Apr 2008 – 17 Apr 2009)
  Simo Krunić (13 Apr 2009 – 30 Jun 2009)
  Dejan Đurđević (1 Jul 2009 – 27 Dec 2011)
  Branko Babić (10 Jan 2012 – 21 May 2012)
  Stevica Kuzmanovski (29 May 2012 – Sep 16, 2012)
  Zoran Milinković (Sep 18, 2012 – Sep 9, 2013)
  Zlatko Krmpotić (Sep 11, 2013 – 23 Dec 2013)
  Milan Milanović (26 Dec 2013 – 16 Mar 2014)
  Zlatko Krmpotić (2014)
  Dejan Đurđević (2014–15)
  Vladimir Petrović (2015)
  Dragoljub Bekvalac (2015)
  Slavko Matić (2016)
  Ljubiša Stamenković (2016–17)
  Petar Divić (2017–18)
  Stevica Kuzmanovski (2019)
  Nikola Puača (2019–20)
  Marko Mićović (2020)
  Miodrag Andjelković (2020–2021)
  Goran Lazarević (2022)
  Stevica Kuzmanovski (2022)
  Nenad Grozdić (2022–)

Shirt sponsors and manufacturers

References

External links

 Official website 
 Unofficial website 

 
Football clubs in Yugoslavia
Association football clubs established in 1911
1911 establishments in Serbia
Football clubs in Belgrade
Palilula, Belgrade